Dimethyl chlorothiophosphate is a chemical that is used as an intermediate in the manufacture of pesticides and plasticisers. It is an organophosphate with sulfur and chlorine also bonded to the central phosphorus atom.

In 1985 American Cyanamid had an accidental release of this chemical from its Linden plant, and it was smelled 32 km away.

References

Organophosphates
Thiophosphoryl compounds